Nonwoven fabric is a fabric-like material made from staple fibre (short) and long fibres (continuous long), bonded together by chemical, mechanical, heat or solvent treatment. The term is used in the textile manufacturing industry to denote fabrics, such as felt, which are neither woven nor knitted. Some non-woven materials  lack sufficient strength unless densified or reinforced by a backing. In recent years, non-wovens have become an alternative to polyurethane foam.

Applications
Nonwoven fabrics are broadly defined as sheet or web structures bonded together by entangling fiber or filaments (and by perforating films) mechanically, thermally or chemically. They are flat or tufted porous sheets that are made directly from separate fibres, molten plastic or plastic film. They are not made by weaving or knitting and do not require converting the fibres to yarn. Typically, a certain percentage of recycled fabrics and oil-based materials are used in nonwoven fabrics.  The percentage of recycled fabrics varies based upon the strength of material needed for the specific use. In addition, some nonwoven fabrics can be recycled after use, given the proper treatment and facilities. For this reason, some consider non-woven a more ecological fabric for certain applications, especially in fields and industries where disposable or single use products are important, such as hospitals, schools, nursing homes and luxury accommodations.

Nonwoven fabrics are engineered fabrics that may be single-use, have a limited life, or be very durable. Nonwoven fabrics provide specific functions such as absorbency, liquid repellence, resilience, stretch, softness, strength, flame retardancy, washability, cushioning, thermal insulation, acoustic insulation, filtration, use as a bacterial barrier and sterility. These properties are often combined to create fabrics suited for specific jobs, while achieving a good balance between product use-life and cost. They can mimic the appearance, texture and strength of a woven fabric and can be as bulky as the thickest paddings. In combination with other materials they provide a spectrum of products with diverse properties, and are used alone or as components of apparel, home furnishings, health care, engineering, industrial and consumer goods.

Non-woven materials are used in numerous applications, including:

Medical
isolation gowns
surgical gowns
surgical drapes and covers
 surgical masks
surgical scrub suits
caps
medical packaging: porosity allows gas sterilization
gloves
shoe covers
bath wipes
wound dressings
drug delivery
plasters

Filters
gasoline, oil and air – including HEPA filtration
water, coffee, tea bags
pharmaceutical industry
mineral processing
liquid cartridge and bag filters
vacuum bags
allergen membranes or laminates with non woven layers

Geotextiles

Nonwoven geotextile containers (sand bags) are used for
soil stabilizers and roadway underlayment
foundation stabilizers
erosion control
canal construction
drainage systems
geomembrane protection
frost protection
pond and canal water barriers
sand infiltration barrier for drainage tile
landfill liners

They are more robust in handling as compared to their woven counterparts, and therefore were often preferred in large-scale erosion protection projects such as those at Amrumbank West; Narrow Neck, Queensland; Kliffende house on Sylt island, and the Eider Barrage. In the last case, only 10 bags out of 48,000 were damaged despite a high installation rate of 700 bags per day.

Other
diaperstock, feminine hygiene, and other absorbent materials
carpet backing, primary and secondary
composites
marine sail laminates
tablecover laminates
chopped strand mat
backing/stabilizer for machine embroidery
packaging  where porosity is needed
Shopping bags
insulation (fiberglass batting)
acoustic insulation for appliances, automotive components, and wall-paneling
pillows, cushions, mattress cores, and upholstery padding
batting in quilts or comforters
consumer and medical face masks
mailing envelopes
tarps, tenting and transportation (lumber, steel) wrapping
disposable clothing (foot coverings, coveralls)
weather resistant house wrap
cleanroom wipes
potting material for plants
wallcovering

Manufacturing processes
Nonwovens are typically manufactured by putting small fibers together in the form of a sheet or web (similar to paper on a paper machine), and then binding them either mechanically (as in the case of felt, by interlocking them with serrated needles such that the inter-fiber friction results in a stronger fabric), with an adhesive, or thermally (by applying binder (in the form of powder, paste, or polymer melt) and melting the binder onto the web by increasing temperature).

Staple nonwovens
Staple nonwovens are made in 4 steps. Fibers are first spun, cut to a few centimeters length, and put into bales. The staple fibers are then blended, "opened" in a multistep process, dispersed on a conveyor belt, and spread in a uniform web by a wetlaid, airlaid, or carding/crosslapping process. Airlaid processing generally uses  fibers. Carding operations typically use ~1.5" (3.8 cm) long fibers. Rayon used to be a common fiber in nonwovens, now greatly replaced by polyethylene terephthalate (PET) and polypropylene. Fiberglass is wetlaid into mats for use in roofing and shingles. Synthetic fiber blends are wetlaid along with cellulose for single-use fabrics. Staple nonwovens are bonded either thermally or by using resin. Bonding can be throughout the web by resin saturation or overall thermal bonding or in a distinct pattern via resin printing or thermal spot bonding. Conforming with staple fibers usually refers to a combination with melt blowing, often used in high-end textile insulations.

Melt-blown
Melt-blown nonwovens are produced by extruding melted polymer fibers through a spin net or die consisting of up to 40 holes per inch to form long thin fibers which are stretched and cooled by passing hot air over the fibers as they fall from the die. The resultant web is collected into rolls and subsequently converted to finished products. The extremely fine fibers (typically polypropylene) differ from other extrusions, particularly spun bond, in that they have low intrinsic strength but much smaller size offering key properties. Often melt blown is added to spun bond to form SM or SMS webs, which are strong and offer the intrinsic benefits of fine fibers such as fine filtration, low pressure drop as used in face masks or filters and physical benefits such as acoustic insulation as used in dishwashers. One of the largest users of SM and SMS materials is the disposable diaper and feminine care industry.

Spunbond nonwovens
Spunbond nonwovens are made in one continuous process.  Fibers are spun and then directly dispersed into a web by deflectors or can be directed with air streams.  This technique leads to faster belt speeds, and cheaper costs.  Several variants of this concept are available, such as the REICOFIL machinery. PP spunbonds run faster and at lower temperatures than PET spunbonds, mostly due to the difference in melting points

Spunbond has been combined with melt-blown nonwovens, conforming them into a layered product called SMS (spun-melt-spun). Melt-blown nonwovens have extremely fine fiber diameters but are not strong fabrics. SMS fabrics, made completely from PP are water-repellent and fine enough to serve as disposable fabrics. Melt-blown is often used as filter media, being able to capture very fine particles. Spunbond is bonded by either resin or thermally. Regarding the bonding of Spunbond, Rieter  has launched a new generation of nonwovens called Spunjet.

Flashspun

Flashspun fabrics are created by spraying a dissolved resin into a chamber, where the solvent evaporates.

Air-laid paper

Air-laid paper is a textile-like material categorized as a nonwoven fabric made from wood pulp. Unlike the normal papermaking process, air-laid paper does not use water as the carrying medium for the fiber. Fibers are carried and formed to the structure of paper by air.

Other
Nonwovens can also start with films and fibrillate, serrate or vacuum-form them with patterned holes. Fiberglass nonwovens are of two basic types. Wet laid mat or "glass tissue" use wet-chopped, heavy denier fibers in the 6 to 20 micrometre diameter range. Flame attenuated mats or "batts" use discontinuous fine denier fibers in the 0.1 to 6 range. The latter is similar, though run at much higher temperatures, to melt-blown thermoplastic nonwovens. Wet laid mat is almost always wet resin bonded with a curtain coater, while batts are usually spray bonded with wet or dry resin. An unusual process produces polyethylene fibrils in a Freon-like fluid, forming them into a paper-like product and then calendering them to create Tyvek.

Bonding
Both staple and spunlaid nonwovens would have no mechanical resistance in and of themselves, without the bonding step. Several methods can be used:
thermal bonding
use of a heat sealer
using a large oven for curing
calendering through heated rollers (called spunbond when combined with spunlaid webs), calenders can be smooth faced for an overall bond or patterned for a softer, more tear resistant bond
hydroentanglement: mechanical intertwining of fibers by water jets (also called spunlace) 
ultrasonic pattern bonding: used in high-loft or fabric insulation/quilts/bedding
needlepunching/needlefelting: mechanical intertwining of fibers by needles
chemical bonding (wetlaid process): use of binders (such as latex emulsion or solution polymers) to chemically join the fibers. A more expensive route uses binder fibers or powders that soften and melt to hold other non-melting fibers together
one type of cotton staple nonwoven is treated with sodium hydroxide to shrink bond the mat, the caustic causes the cellulose-based fibers to curl and shrink around one another as the bonding technique
one unusual polyamide(Cerex) is self-bonded with gas-phase acid
melt-blown: fiber is bonded as air attenuated fibers intertangle with themselves during simultaneous fiber and web formation.

Disposability
The industry has attempted to define "flushability". They encourage voluntary testing of flushability by producers. They also encourage clear marking of non-flushable products as "No Flush" (rather than fine print on the bottom of products) including creating a "No Flush" logo.

The wastewater industry is encouraging a standard definition (rather than one which varies with each producer) of flushability, including dispersibility, and third-party assessment or verification, such as by NSF International. They believe that products should be safe for both septic and sewer systems (flushable and dispersible, respectively). Orange County Sanitation District has created a campaign, "What 2 Flush", which recommends flushing only the "three P's—pee, poop and [toilet] paper".

See also
Disposable towel

References

15.Non-woven raw material, Retrieved on 2023-03-07.

External links

Association of Nonwovens (EDANA: Europe)
The Association of the Nonwovens Fabrics Industry (INDA: US)

 
Synthetic paper
Packaging materials